Copán is a major Mayan archaeological site (a UNESCO World Heritage Site) in Honduras.

Copan or Copán may refer to:

Places

Brazil
 Edifício Copan, a landmark building in São Paulo

Honduras
 Copán Department, the province in Honduras containing the Mayan ruins at Copán as well as other ruins at La Entrada
 Copán Ruinas, the Honduran town near the archaeological site
 Santa Rosa de Copán, the capital of the department

United States
 Copan, Oklahoma, a town

People
 Paul Copan

Medical
 CoPAN is an acronym for a rare disease, COASY protein-associated neurodegeneration, which is a type of neurodegeneration with brain iron accumulation disorder